Maje e Madhe is a mountain in the Albanian part of the Albanian Alps. It reaches a height of 2,011m above sea level. The Albanian name "Maja e Madhe" means 'Big Peak', although in comparison to other Albanian mountains it is quite small.

Mountains of Albania
Accursed Mountains